Notodden is a city and municipality in Vestfold og Telemark county, Norway.  It is part of the traditional region of Øst-Telemark.  The administrative centre of the municipality is the city of Notodden.

Notodden was separated from the municipality of Heddal in 1913 to become a separate city and municipality.  On 1 January 1964, the rural municipalities of Heddal and Gransherad were merged into Notodden to form a new enlarged municipality.

Notodden is on the shore of Heddalsvatnet lake, and the Tinn River runs through the town into the lake. Norway's biggest stave church, Heddal Stave Church, can be seen a few kilometres from the city centre.

Notodden Airport, Tuven, is located west of the city centre.  Norsk Hydro was founded in this town.  Notodden is well known for the annual Notodden Blues Festival, which is considered one of the best blues festivals in Europe. It also has a well-known metal festival called Motstøy Festivalen.

The football club Notodden FK is headquartered here.

Name 

The name "Notodden" comes from the cotter's place (husmannsplass) Notodden that belonged to the farm Tinne gård—near the mouth of the river Tinnelva close to the lake Heddalsvatnet.

The first element of the name is not which means "to fish using a seine" and the last element is the definite form of odde meaning "headland".  Thus the general meaning of the name is "the fishing place".

Coat-of-arms 
The coat-of-arms is from modern times.  They were granted on 11 August 1939.  The arms show a silver-colored river and four lightning strikes. One of the first hydroelectric power stations in Norway was established in the late 19th century at the Tinnfoss waterfall on the Tinn River.

Twin towns 

In 2008, Notodden city council decided to end the twin city agreements with Ilisalmi, Nyköping and Stelle. At the same time Suwałki was approved as a new twin city.

The following cities are twinned with Notodden:
  Clarksdale, Mississippi, United States
  Suwałki, Podlaskie Voivodeship, Poland

Former twin cities of Notodden:
  Iisalmi, Eastern Finland, Finland
  Nyköping, Södermanland County, Sweden
  Stelle, Lower Saxony, Germany

Notable residents 
Notodden is the hometown of organist Kåre Nordstoga, the internationally known author Hans Herbjørnsrud who was born in Heddal, and the Hardanger fiddlemaker Olav Gunnarsson Helland (1875–1939) who many consider the finest of the twentieth century. Composer Klaus Egge, born 1906 in Gransherad, also lived in Notodden.

Olympic gold medalist Ådne Søndrål was born in Notodden.

American blues musician Seasick Steve, who is achieving fame in the United Kingdom, currently resides in Notodden. Norwegian blues musician Margit Bakken and painter and author Tor-Arne Moen also live in Notodden.

One of the most influential Norwegian black metal bands, Emperor, came from Notodden, as does Mortiis, Peccatum, Star of Ash, Leprous, and Zyklon. Emperor's singer, Ihsahn, still resides in Notodden.

 and

 Olav Andresen (1877 in Heddal - 1950) a Norwegian politician, Mayor of Notodden 1920s & 1930s
 Ambros Sollid (1880 in Heddal - 1973) an agronomist and politician, Mayor of Skien 1935–1937
 Carl Bugge (1881 in Heddal – 1968) a Norwegian geologist and academic
 Helga Stene (1904 in Notodden – 1983) an educator, feminist and resistance member
 Aage Eriksen (1917 in Notodden – 1998 in Notodden) a wrestler and silver medallist at the 1948 Summer Olympics
 Egil Bergsland (1924 in Notodden - 2007) a Norwegian politician, Mayor of Notodden  1971 to 1975
 Sissel Sellæg (1928 in Notodden – 2014) a Norwegian actress 
 Hilde Mæhlum (born 1945 in Notodden) a Norwegian sculptor
 Magne Orre (born 1950 in Notodden) a cyclist, competed at the 1972 & 1976 Summer Olympics
 Helga Flatland (born 1984 in Notodden) a Norwegian novelist and children's writer

Climate
Notodden has a humid continental climate (Dfb). Situated inland at low altitude in the Telemark region, it is one of the warmest towns in Norway in summer, but winters can be cold. The weather station at Notodden Airport has been recording since March 1970 (temperature and wind speed). Precipitation data is from a different station in Notodden. The all-time high temperature  was recorded July 27 2018.

References

External links 

 Municipal fact sheet from Statistics Norway
 
 Notodden on Flickr
 1908 in Notodden: Of course the workers must have houses, from Norsk Hydro

 
Municipalities of Vestfold og Telemark
Cities and towns in Norway